Guaimura (or more commonly Guaymuras) refers to a name the Spanish gave to a part of Honduras. Columbus mentions a town named Guaymuras near Trujillo. Other common names for the territory now known as the country of Honduras included Honduras and Higueras.  See the entry on Honduras for additional discussion.

External links
text of the Brevissima Relación containing the Guaimura reference.

History of Honduras